The 1997 Copa Libertadores Final was a two-legged football match-up to determine the 1997 Copa Libertadores champion. It was contested by Peruvian club Sporting Cristal and Brazilian club Cruzeiro. The first leg was played on August 6 at Peru's National Stadium, with the second leg played on August 13 at Cruzeiro's venue, Mineirão in Belo Horizonte.

Cruzeiro and Sporting Cristal were in their 3rd and 1st Copa Libertadores finals, respectively. Cruzeiro's last appearance had been in 1977, in which they lost to Argentine club Boca Juniors.

Qualified teams

Venues

Rules
The final was played over two legs; home and away. The team that accumulated the most points —three for a win, one for a draw, zero for a loss— after the two legs was crowned champion. The away-goals rule was not used. In case both teams had finished tied on points after the second leg, the team with the best goal difference would have won. If the two teams had had equal goal difference, extra time would've been used. The extra time consisted of two 15-minute halves. If the tie was still not broken, a penalty shoot-out would ensue according to the Laws of the Game.

Route to the Finals

Cruzeiro qualified to the 1997 Copa Libertadores as the champion team in the 1996 Brazilian Cup. Sporting Cristal qualified as 1996 Peruvian champions.

Group 4 of the First Stage

Both Cruzeiro and Sporting Cristal were drawn into Group 4, together with their compatriots Grêmio (1996 Brazilian champions) and Alianza Lima (1996 Peruvian championship 2nd place), respectively. Cruzeiro's first group match was against Grêmio in Belo Horizonte. Cruzeiro lost 2-1, with their goal scored by Aílton. Cristal's first group match was against their rivals Alianza, in Lima. The Peruvian teams tied by 0-0.

Cruzeiro second group match was on the road against Alianza Lima. The Brazilian team lost by 1-0. They stayed on the road to play Sporting Cristal. The Peruvian team won by 1-0, and Cruzeiro lost its third game in the tournament, with a few chances of classification to the next stage.

Sporting Cristal third group match was in its home ground too, now against Grêmio, and winning again by 1-0.

Cruzeiro fourth group match was against Grêmio, but this time in the rival's ground, in Porto Alegre. With the obligation of winning to keep the chance of classification alive, Cruzeiro made 1-0 with Palhinha and scored its first three point in the competition. On the same day, Sporting Cristal tied again by 1-1 against Alianza Lima.

The next two games Cruzeiro played at home. Alianza Lima visited first and lost the match 2-0, goals by Reinaldo and Palhinha. In Cruzeiro's last match of group play, they played host to Sporting Cristal, whom they beat 2-1, goals by Alex Mineiro and Reinaldo.

Sporting Cristal last group match was visiting Grêmio in Porto Alegre and losing by 2-0.

Cruzeiro and Sporting Cristal finished 2nd and 3rd, respectively, which advanced them to the Round of 16, together with Grêmio, who finished 1st.

Cruzeiro in the knockout stages

In the round of 16, they played against Ecuatorian club El Nacional. The first leg was played in Quito and Cruzeiro lost the match 1-0. Second leg, played at home, Cruzeiro won 2-1, with Marcelo Ramos scoring twice, sending the decision to the penalty shootout. In the penalty kicks, Cruzeiro won 5-3, advancing to the next stage.

Cruzeiro's quarterfinal match-up was against fellow Brazilian side Grêmio over again. The first leg, played at home, was won 2-0, goals by Alex Mineiro and Elivélton. The second leg, played in Porto Alegre, was lost 2-1, Fabinho scoring, with Cruzeiro advancing to the next stage by goal difference (3-2).

Cruzeiro's semifinal match-up was against Chilean club Colo-Colo. Cruzeiro won the first leg 1-0, goal scored by Marcelo Ramos, in Belo Horizonte. In Santiago lost 3-2, with Marcelo Ramos and Cleison scoring the goals, deciding again in the penalty kicks. In the penalty shootout Cruzeiro won 4-1, advancing to the Copa Libertadores Final Matches after 20 years.

As of the finals, Cruzeiro has an efficacy rating of 50% (6 wins, 6 loss).

Sporting Cristal in the knockout stages

In the round of 16, they played against Argentine club Vélez Sarsfield. The first leg was played home and the teams tied 0-0. Second leg, played away in Buenos Aires, Cristal surprisingly won 1-0, advancing to the next stage.

Sporting Cristal's quarterfinal match-up was against Bolivian club Bolívar. The first leg, played in La Paz, Cristal loss 2-1. But in the second leg, played home, the Peruvian squad won 3-0, advancing to the next stage by goal difference (4-2).

In the semifinals Sporting Cristal met another Argentine club, Racing Club. In the first leg, played in Avellaneda, Cristal loss 3-2. In the second leg, played home, Cristal won 4-1 and advanced to the next stage over again by goal difference (6-4). Was the best season of a Peruvian team in Copa Libertadores.

As of the finals, Sporting Cristal has an efficacy rating of 50% (5 wins, 3 draws, 4 loss).

Knockout stages summary

Final summary

First leg

Second leg

External links
CONMEBOL's official website

1
Copa Libertadores Finals
Copa Libertadores Final 1997
Copa Libertadores Final 1997